María del Carmen González (born 6 April 1941) is a Spanish gymnast. She competed in six events at the 1960 Summer Olympics.

References

1941 births
Living people
Spanish female artistic gymnasts
Olympic gymnasts of Spain
Gymnasts at the 1960 Summer Olympics
Gymnasts from Madrid